The Magic Hat is a 2002 children's picture book by Mem Fox and illustrated by Tricia Tusa. It is about a wizard's hat that appears in a crowded park and alights on people's heads, turning them into various animals. Then, the hat's owner, a wizard, shows up and restores things back to normal.

Reception
A review in Booklist of The Magic Hat wrote: "The bouncy rhyme is fun if undistinguished, but the artwork, in its oversize format, overflows with good humor". Books+Publishing found it "..a picture book about happiness that IS happy..".

The Magic Hat has also been reviewed by Kirkus Reviews, Publishers Weekly, School Library Journal, Horn Book Guides, Magpies,Magpies, and the Australian Book Review.

It was the chosen book for the 2007 National Simultaneous Storytime.

References

External links
 Library holdings of The Magic Hat

Australian picture books
2002 children's books
Picture books by Mem Fox
Fiction about magic